Beohari railway station is a railway station in Beohari town, Madhya Pradesh, India, with station code BEHR. The station has two platforms. Passenger, Express and Superfast trains halt there.

References

Railway stations in Shahdol district
Jabalpur railway division